RT DE (formerly RT Deutsch) was a television channel based in Moscow and Berlin. It was part of the RT network, a Russian state-controlled international television network, funded by the Russian government. The website was launched in late 2014.

After failing to secure the appropriate broadcast license, RT DE was banned in Germany in February 2022. Nonetheless, RT DE still has an accessible internet presence in Germany and offers live TV in German on its website.

History
On 6 November 2014, RT launched a German-language network.

In August 2021 Luxembourg denied a broadcast license for RT DE.

YouTube removed the station's two channels from its platform on 28 September 2021 for breaking its policies on COVID-19 misinformation. RT's editor-in-chief Margarita Simonyan urged the Russian authorities to ban German media organisations in Russia and impose sanctions against YouTube. The Russian government promised to adopt "retaliatory measures". According to Politico, RT's "German-language outlets have built an audience that leans to the political far right and is receptive to vaccine skepticism."

When a YouTube channel is removed, its owners are not allowed to create, own or use any other YouTube channels. In December 2021 RT tried to evade this restriction and created a new channel. The channel was removed.

Licensing issues 
The parent organization TV Novosti tried unsuccessfully to apply for a television license in Luxembourg in June 2021. Serbia issued a permit in December. On December 16, RT DE went on the air via Eutelsat satellite and various transmission channels on the Internet. The broadcaster relies on a media directive from the Council of Europe that would entitle it to broadcast in Germany. The German supervisory authorities are not responsible because the program is produced in Moscow and broadcast from there.

One day later, on 17 December 2021, the German media regulator  (MABB) launched proceedings against RT DE for broadcasting without a license. On 22 December 2021, the European satellite operator Eutelsat removed RT DE from its platform on Eutelsat 9B.

At the beginning of February 2022, RT DE announced its intention to appeal against the decision, though according to Reuters, it formally had only until the end of 2021 to respond. MABB and Germany's  (ZAK) said the station needed a license meeting the terms of Germany's , because RT DE Productions GmbH is based in Berlin-Adlershof and not in Moscow. In a statement, ZAK said: "The organization and distribution of the TV program via live stream on the internet, via the mobile and smart TV app 'RT News' and via satellite must be discontinued."

In response, the Russian Foreign Ministry withdrew the accreditation of the German broadcaster Deutsche Welle and initiated proceedings to classify Deutsche Welle as a "foreign agent". The German government called for the ban to be revoked, and Secretary of State for Culture and Media Claudia Roth (Alliance 90/The Greens) called the ban an "aggressive act". Deutsche Welle protested the withdrawal of accreditations and the announced ban on broadcasting. DW Director General Peter Limbourg remarked that “The measures taken by the Russian authorities are completely incomprehensible and a complete overreaction. We are being played with here in a way that the media only has to experience in autocracies".

Termination 
Following the beginning of the 2022 Russian invasion of Ukraine, the European Commission banned all activities of RT and Sputnik in the territory of the European Union. RT DE's activities were thus terminated.

Reception
In Handelsblatt, Andreas Macho concluded after an investigation of the program of the German branch of RT in November 2014: "The bottom line [is that] RT Germany spreads more untruths, reductions and distortions than this – promise as the moderators constantly – would enlighten". Die Tageszeitung summed up the selection of the interlocutors of the first weeks of RT Deutsch with "either flaming anti-American and European opponents of the left and right margins" together. In February 2016 a former employee called RT Deutsch "skilful propaganda" and claimed that they are concentrating on an audience of conspiracy theorists and persons on the far-right of the political spectrum. In February 2021, through obtained emails, a Der Spiegel investigation provided insights on how the station planned a platform for fringe groups to undermine democracy in Germany.

See also
Propaganda in the Russian Federation

References

External links

RT (TV network)
Television networks in Russia
Television channels and stations established in 2014
Television channels and stations disestablished in 2022
2014 establishments in Germany
2022 disestablishments in Germany
German-language television stations
24-hour television news channels in Germany
Media of Neue Rechte